Benighted is a French deathgrind band formed in Saint-Étienne in 1998. The group comprises vocalist Julien Truchan, guitarists Emmanuel Dalle and Fabien "Fack" Desgardins, bassist Pierre Arnoux and drummer Kevin Paradis,  Benighted have released nine studio albums.

History 
Benighted was formed in Saint-Étienne, Rhône-Alpes, France, in May 1998 by vocalist Julien Truchan, guitarists Liem N'Guyen and Olivier Gabriel, drummer Fred Fayolle and bassist Chart. Their self-titled first album was self-released in 2000 and was a combination of death metal, black metal and grindcore. The following positive response earned the band a record deal with Adipocère Records in early 2001. During the 2001 recording sessions, Benighted moved towards a more technical form of death metal and released their second album, Psychose, in 2003. For the subsequent touring, Remy Aubrespin took over on bass.

The band entered studio in late 2004, without a bassist. After the 2004 release of Insane Cephalic Production, bassist Eric Lombard joined as a new member. With Insane Cephalic Production the band also started working with producer Kristian "Kohle" Kohlmannslehner in his Kohlekeller Studio in Germany. Kohlmannslehner has produced all Benighted albums since then. Benighted subsequently toured throughout Europe with  Morbid Angel, Deicide and Fear Factory among others.

Benighted released their fourth album Identisick in 2006 and Fayolle was replaced by Kevin "Kikou" Foley on drums. The band signed a new deal with Osmose Productions in 2007 and released Icon in October that year. In late 2009, Benighted signed to Season of Mist and released Asylum Cave in 2011. Truchan contributed guest vocals to 2011 album Global Flatline by Aborted. A music video for the song "Let The Blood Spill Between My Broken Teeth" was released in February 2012.

Following a brief recording session, Benighted released their 8th full-length studio album Necrobreed on
24 February 2017 via Season of Mist records. This record is also the first record to feature veteran death metal drummer Romain Goulon. Necrobreed maintains traditional fast-paced sound of Benighted, that is a mixture of death metal and grindcore heaviness. The foundation of the songwriting is based on grind.

The EP Dogs Always Bite Harder than Their Master comes on the heels of the 2017 LP Necrobreed and consists of three new songs, a cover song and six older songs recorded live, which makes this EP almost 35 minutes long.

The album  Obscene Repressed  by Benighted, released on 10 April 2020. There are also a good number of guest artists on this album: Jamey Jasta from Hatebreed, Sebastian Grihm from Cytotoxin, and Karsten Jäger from Disbelief.

Members 
Current
 Julien Truchan – vocals (1998–present)
 Pierre Arnoux – bass, backing vocals (2014–present)
 Emmanuel Dalle – guitar (2014–present)
 Kevin Paradis – drums (2017–present)

Former
 Christophe Charretier – bass (1998–2002)
 Fred Fayolle – drums (1998–2006; died 2019)
 Liem N'Guyen – guitar (1998–2012), bass (2002)
 Oliver Gabriel – guitar (1998–2017)
 Remy Aubrespin – bass (2002–2003)
 Bertrand "Bert" Arnaud – bass (2003–2004)
 Eric "Candy" Lombard – bass (2004–2014)
 Kevin Foley – drums (2006–2016)
 Adrian Guerin – guitar (2012–2014)
 Alexis Lieu – bass (2014)
 Romain Goulon – drums (2016–2017)
 Fabien "Fack" Desgardins – guitar (2017–2022)

Timeline

Discography 
Benighted (2000)
Psychose (2002)
Insane Cephalic Production (2004)
Identisick (2006)
Icon (2007)
Asylum Cave (2011)
Carnivore Sublime (2014)
Necrobreed (2017)
Obscene Repressed (2020)

References

External links 

French death metal musical groups
Musical groups established in 1998
Musical quintets
Deathgrind musical groups
1998 establishments in France
Season of Mist artists